The Russian Review is an independent peer-reviewed multi-disciplinary academic journal devoted to the history, literature, culture, fine arts, cinema, society, and politics of the Russian Federation, former Soviet Union and former Russian Empire. The journal was established in 1941 and is published quarterly by Wiley-Blackwell for the Contact Center for Russian, East European & Eurasian Studies at the University of Kansas. The former editor is Dr. Eve Levin, University of Kansas who retired and was Replaced by Erik R. Scott in 2020. The journal's board of trustees is not aligned with any national, political, or professional association.

External links
The Russian Review @ Wiley-Blackwell
The Russian Review @ JSTOR

Area studies journals
Publications established in 1941
English-language journals
Wiley-Blackwell academic journals
Quarterly journals